The North American XB-28 Dragon (NA-63) was an aircraft proposed by North American Aviation to fill a strong need in the United States Army Air Corps for a high-altitude medium bomber. It never entered production, with only two prototypes being built.

Design and development
The order for a high-altitude medium bomber was put out on 13 February 1940; the XB-28 first flew on 26 April 1942. The XB-28 was based on North American Aviation's highly successful B-25 Mitchell, but as it evolved it became a completely new design, much more reminiscent of the Martin B-26 Marauder. The overall configuration of the B-25 and XB-28 were fairly similar; the most important distinction was that the twin tail of the B-25 was changed to a single tail on the XB-28. It was among the first combat aircraft with a pressurized cabin.

The XB-28 proved an excellent design, with significantly better performance than that of the B-25, but it was never put into production. High-altitude bombing was hampered significantly by factors such as clouds and wind, which were frequent occurrences in the Pacific. At the same time, medium bombers were becoming much more effective at lower altitudes. The gains in aircraft performance that came with high-altitude flight were not considered sufficient to justify switching from low-altitude bombing.

Testing and evaluation
Even though the Army Air Forces rejected the XB-28 as a bomber, they ordered another prototype. Designated XB-28A, it was meant to explore the possibility of use as a reconnaissance aircraft. The XB-28A crashed into the Pacific Ocean off Southern California after the crew bailed out on 4 August 1943.

Specifications (XB-28A)

See also

References

External links

 Joe Baugher's Encyclopedia of American Aircraft
 USAF Museum
 Several photographs of the NA-63 XB-28 40-3056

B-28
North American B-28
Shoulder-wing aircraft
Aircraft first flown in 1942
Twin piston-engined tractor aircraft